Institute of History may refer to:

Institute of History Sarajevo, in Bosnia and Herzegovina
Institute of History Belgrade, in Serbia
, in Serbia 
Institute of Historical Research, (IHR), School of Advanced Study, in UK
Suffolk Institute of Archaeology & History,  in UK
Gilder Lehrman Institute of American History, in US
Omohundro Institute of Early American History and Culture, in US
 Albany Institute of History & Art
Pan American Institute of Geography and History
Institute for Historical Review, in US (Holocaust denial)
Institute of History of Ukraine, in Ukraine
Institute of history, ethnology and right, in Ukraine
Institute of History of Azerbaijan National Academy of Sciences, in Azerbaijan
Saint Petersburg Institute of History, in Russia
Norwegian Institute of Local History, in Norway 
Institute of Bavarian History, in Germany
Institute of Contemporary History (Munich), in Germany
Kaiser Wilhelm Institute for German History
A.D. Xenopol Institute of History
Huygens Institute for the History of the Netherlands
National Institute of Korean History
Institute of Baltic Region History and Archaeology
Lithuanian Institute of History
Institute for the History of Ancient Civilizations
Institute of History of Nicaragua and Central America

Other 

 Institute for the History of Psychiatry
International Institute of Social History
 Army Institute of Military History, in Pakistan 
 Institute of History of the Party (Ukraine)
 Institute of Political History
Christian History Institute
Netherlands Institute for Art History
Max Planck Institute for the Science of Human History
Wellcome Institute for the History of Medicine
Institute for History of Musical Reception and Interpretation
London Museum and Institute of Natural History
Institute of Archaeology and Art History, Cluj-Napoca

See also 
 Institute of Contemporary History (disambiguation)